Deltophora is a genus of moths in the family Gelechiidae. The genus was originally described from South Africa and based on a taxonomic revision contains about 20 species on all continents except Antarctica. Host plants of larvae and adults are only known for two Chinese species of Deltophora.

Species
peltosema species-group
Deltophora angulella Sattler, 1979
Deltophora distinctella Sattler, 1979
Deltophora diversella Sattler, 1979
Deltophora fasciella Sattler, 1979
Deltophora peltosema (Lower, 1900)
Deltophora typica Sattler, 1979
maculata species-group
Deltophora beatrix Sattler, 1979
Deltophora maculata (Staudinger, 1879)
Deltophora pauperella Sattler, 1979
stictella species-group
Deltophora stictella (Rebel, 1927)
korbi species-group
Deltophora korbi (Caradja, 1920)
glandiferella species-group
Deltophora glandiferella (Zeller, 1873)
Deltophora sella (Chambers, 1874)
flavocincta species-group
Deltophora caymana Sattler, 1979
Deltophora duplicata Sattler, 1979
Deltophora flavocincta Sattler, 1979
Deltophora lanceella Sattler, 1979
Deltophora minuta Sattler, 1979
Deltophora suffusella Sattler, 1979
unknown species-group
Deltophora digitiformis Li, Li & Wang, 2002
Deltophora fuscomaculata Park, 1988
Deltophora gielisia Hull, 1995
Deltophora quadrativalvata Li, Li & Wang, 2002

Former species
Deltophora abrupta Omelko, 1995 is Epichostis abrupta (Omelko, 1995)

References

 ; ;  2009: Checklist of Gelechiidae (Lepidoptera) in America North of Mexico. Zootaxa, 2231: 1-39. Abstract & excerpt
 , 2002: A systematic study on the genus Deltophora Janse from China (Lepidoptera: Gelechiidae). Acta Zootaxonomica Sinica 27 (1): 129-135.

 
Anomologini